Okello Oculi (born 1 January 1942) is a Ugandan novelist, poet, and chronicler of rural African village life. Currently, he is a private political and social consultant based in Abuja, Nigeria. Before that, he served as Professor of Social & Economic Research at Ahmadu Bello University in Zaria, Nigeria.

Background
He was born in 1942, in Dokolo District, Northern Uganda, back when the district was still part of Lira District.

Education
He was educated at Soroti College, in Soroti, and St. Peter's College Tororo, both in Eastern Uganda. He then attended St. Mary's College Kisubi for his A-Level education (S5 -S6). He entered Makerere University, Uganda's oldest university, where he studied political science, graduating  in 1967, with the degree of Bachelor of Arts in Political Science. During his undergraduate studies at Makerere, he spent one year, from 1964 until 1965, as an exchange student at Stanford University in Palo Alto, California, United States. In 1968, he obtained the degree of Master of Arts (MA), from the University of Essex, in the United Kingdom. His Doctor of Philosophy (PhD), was obtained in 1972, from the University of Wisconsin, in Madison, Wisconsin, United States.

Professional work
His writing is filled with authentic snatches of conversation, proverbs, and folk wisdom. His poetry, like that of Okot p'Bitek and Joseph Buruga, seeks to re-assert the cultural heritage of Africa with a critique of foreign influences in East Africa.

Selected bibliography
 Prostitute (1968)
 Orphan (1968)
 Kanti Riti (1974)
 Malak: An African Political Poem (1976)
 Kookolem (1978)
 Health Problems in Rural and Uurban Africa (1981)
 Nigerian Alternatives (1987)
 Political Economy of Malnutrition (1987)
 Song for the Sun in Us (Poets of Africa; 2000)
 Discourses on Africa Affairs: Directions and Destinies for the 20th Century (2000)
 Song for the Sun in Us  - (2000)
 Discourses on African Affairs: Directions and Destinies For the 21st Century - (1999)
 Political Economy of Malnutrition  - (1987) 
 Kookolem - (1976) 
 Malak: An African Political Poem - (1976)
 Imperialism, Settlers and Capitalism in Kenya - (1975)
 Kanta Riti - (1972) 
 Orphan - (1968) (dramatized poetry)
 Prostitute - (1968)

See also
 Dokolo District
 Makerere University
 Stanford University
 University of Essex
 Ahmadou Bello University

References

External links
Britannica Online Encyclopedia: Okello Oculi
Africa: Obama Must Tame America for the Continent of His Ancestors , The Monitor, 20 February 2008

1942 births
Living people
20th-century Ugandan poets
People from Dokolo District
Makerere University alumni
Alumni of the University of Essex
University of Wisconsin–Madison alumni
Academic staff of Ahmadu Bello University
Ugandan male poets
20th-century male writers